The Baekdu-daegan is a mountain-system and watershed-crest-line which runs through almost all of the length of the Korean Peninsula, from Paektu Mountain (2,744m) in the north to the Cheonhwang-bong or "Heavenly Monarch Peak" of Jirisan (1,915m) in the south.  It has 13 Jeongmaek or branch-ranges that begin on the mainline range and channel Korea's biggest rivers to the east, west and south seas. 

The Baekdu-daegan is important in traditional Korean geography and thought, a key aspect of Pungsujiri philosophy and practices.  It is often referred to as the "spine" or "backbone" of the Korean Peninsula, and depicted in various historic and modern artworks including national maps.  Under traditional Korean thought influenced by Daoism and Neo-Confucianism, Mt. Baekdu-san is regarded as the northern root-origin of the mountain-system, and conceived-of as the grand patriarch of all Korean mountains; while Jiri-san at the southern end is conceived-of as the grand matriarch of all Korean mountains. The mountain-system incorporates the Sobaek mountain range and most of the Taebaek mountain range, according to Western-style geography.

The term Baekdu-daegan most specifically refers to an elongated mountain ridge that runs from Mt. Baekdu-san in the north, to Mt. Jiri-san in the south, a crestline which no body of water ever crosses, about 1500 km long. Many Koreans and a few international visitors hike some parts of the crestline trail, and some aspire to hike all of it within South Korea, an expedition of 735 km, usually undertaken from south to north. Some of these people dream of someday trekking along the entire trail across the militarized border and up to Baekdu-san, although no hiking of this kind is permitted in North Korea. The section in South Korea was designated as a national nature-preservation park in 2006 by the South Korean government.

History 
During the Japanese occupation from 1910 to 1945, Japan attempted to restructure Korean mountains in accordance with the concept of mountain ranges as used in Western geography. The notion of the mountain ranges that prevailed during the Japanese occupation era was one based on geological structures under the ground, rather than topographical ones.  

Hiking along the 1500-meter crestline of the Baekdu-daegan was never an activity in all of Korean history until the very late 20th century, and there was no trail along almost all of it, because the domination of the alpine areas by Korean tigers made it too dangerous to be up there.  Avid Korean hikers took an interest in it and began pioneering and marking trails, and making maps, starting in the 1980s.  In the 1990s governments of the counties that the crestline passes through or forms their borders began making/improving trails, out of pride that their territory is part of this nation-defining range; by the 2000s they were setting-up monuments, information-signs and trail-markers, improving path-stairways, water and access-points.  In 2003 the Korea Forest Service was granted authority over the region as a whole within South Korea, but the scope of that authority and the geographical boundaries of "the Baekdu-daegan Region" have remained undefined and controversial.  Before 2005 the Baekdu-daegan remained entirely unknown to the world outside Korea, but then Tourism professor David A. Mason began to promote it to the global audience in English by establishing a website and publishing articles.  Andrew Douch and Roger Shepherd, mountain-loving hikers from New Zealand, trekked all of the available crestline trail while keeping careful records, and then with research & editing support from Prof. Mason wrote a guidebook to the trail, the most extensive information about the Baekdu-daegan in English by-far.  All these efforts became a good success, attracting hikers from many other nations to explore its trails.  On January 3, 2011, Mason was appointed the Honorary Public-Relations Ambassador of the Baekdu-daegan by Minister Chung of the Korea Forest Service, under authority of Korean President Lee Myung-bak.  Roger Shepherd has continued his explorations and international promotions of the Baekdu-daegan Trail, including expeditions into some of its areas in North Korea.

Mountains

North Korea

Paektu Mountain
Podahoesan
Wŏnsan
T'aebaeksan
Taebaegyŏksan
Sahyangsan
Nangnimsan
Sanggomsan
Mayusan
Dumusan
Aejŏnsan
Ch'ŏrunsan
Ogangsan
Murabalsan
Kochasan
Chaeryŏngsan
Hwayŏsan
Turyusan
Pallyongsan
Maŭnsan
Paekhaksan
P'ungnyusan
Mount Kumgang
Magirasan

South Korea

Seoraksan
Odaesan
Dutasan
Cheongoksan
Seonjaryeong
Daebaksan
Hambaeksan
Taebaeksan
Sudasan
Baekbyeongsan
Jakseongsan
Daemisan
Gyeripsan
Joryeongsan
Huiyangsan
Daeyasan
Burilsan
Hwasan
Songnisan
Gubongsan
Bonghwangsan
Ungisan
Gosan
Heugunsan
Gyebangsan
Hwangaksan
Samseongsan
Udusan
Daedeoksan
Deogyusan
Bonghwangsan
Baegunsan
Jirisan

See also
List of mountains in Korea
Geography of North Korea
Geography of South Korea

References

External links
David A. Mason's website on the Baekdu-daegan
 The Baekdu-daegan 2007 Expedition homepage and blog

Mountain ranges of South Korea
Mountain ranges of North Korea